Solved is the second self-produced solo EP by Svoy. It was released internationally on August 21, 2012.

Track listing

Personnel
Svoy – keyboards, vocals, producer, programming, arrangement, sound engineering, mixing, mastering, art direction, design

References

2012 EPs
Svoy albums